Kuningan Regency is a regency (kabupaten) of West Java province of Indonesia. It covers an area of 1,194.09 km2, and it had a population of 1,035,589 at the 2010 census and 1,167,686 at the 2020 census; the official estimate as at mid 2021 was 1,180,391. Kuningan Regency is located in the east of the province, south of Cirebon Regency and bordering Central Java Province to the east. The town and district of Kuningan is its administrative capital.

Etymology 
The area of eastern slopes and valley of Mount Cereme has been known as the Kuningan Duchy since the Hindu period as part of the Galuh Kingdom circa 14th century. The name "Kuningan" is believed to have come from the Sundanese word kuning meaning "yellow". Alternate theory suggests the name proliferated from the Sundanese word kuningan, a local name for brass, the metal which have been produced and used for hundreds of years in this area. While according to the local tradition, the name Kuningan derived from the Prince Arya Kuningan or Adipati Kemuning, a local hero and ruler of this region circa 1498.

History

Prehistoric era
The oldest archaeological findings in the region were found in 1972, objects such as sherds, stone tools, gravestones and ceramics were unearthed in the Cipari megalithic site with evidences from the bronze and iron metallurgical culture, assumes it belonged to the Old Megalithicum age, from around 3500 BC to 1500 BC. Meanwhile, Ekadjati argues in his book that the Neolithic era spanned from 2500 BC to 1500 BC. After that era, Megalithic era began until early centuries of Common Era. Based on findings, at those times, prehistoric humans in Kuningan were at the transition of semi-nomadic and pastoralism. They mainly lived near rivers and water springs in eastern slopes of Mount Ciremai.

Hindu-Buddhist period
The area around Kuningan was originally under the control of Tarumanagara Kingdom. After the split of Galuh and Sunda kingdom, Galuh came into ruling the region, the reference to which were found in the story of Parahyangan (Carita Parahyangan).

At the end of 7th century, Tarumanagara Kingdom collapsed. Kuningan Kingdom, and other small kingdoms, came up to rule the territory of the former Tarumanagara. Kuningan Kingdom territory was bordered between Galuh and Indraprahasta Kingdoms. The first king of the kingdom was Sang Pandawa. The person was also called Sang Wiragati.

In 671, Sang Pandawa married off their daughter, Sangkari to Demunawan. He was son of Danghiyang Guru Sempakwaja, a resiguru (clergy) of Sanghiyang (a fusion of ancestor worshiping religion and Hindu), based in Galunggung. However, Danghiyang Guru Sempakwaja disliked Sang Pandawa's behavior. He requested Sanjaya, king of Galuh Kingdom, to invade Kuningan Kingdom which was still ruled by Sang Pandawa.

After the conflict, Danghiyang Guru Sempakwaja appointed Sang Pandawa a resiguru in Layuwatang. The king position was then succeeded by Demunawan in 723 with royal title of Rahiyangtang Kuku. During his rule, capital city of the kingdom was in Saunggalah (now in Salia kampong, Ciherang Village, Nusaherang District). Parts of Galunggung was also absorbed by Kuningan Kingdom under his reign.

Saunggalah was ruled by Rakeyan Dharmasiksa from 1163 to 1175. He was son of Prabu Dharmakusuma, king of Sunda Kingdom reigning 1157–1175. After the death of his father, Rakeyan Dharmasiksa succeeded as king of Sunda Kingdom. As ruler of Saunggalah, he was then succeeded by his son Ragasuci, or sometimes called Rajaputra. With royal title Rahiyang Saunggalah, he reigned until 1298. He married Dara Puspa, princess of Melayu Kingdom. Rahiyang Saunggalah then succeeded as king of Sunda Kingdom in 1298 with royal title Prabu Ragasuci. In Saunggalah, he was then succeeded by his son Citragandha.

Ekadjati argues that based on these information, rulers of Kuningan Kingdom and Sunda Kingdom were still relatives. Those two kingdoms were still distinct, not in a status of vassal and superior states, but the king of Kuningan had lower status than king of Sunda's.

In 14th century, Galuh Kingdom unified majority of lands of the Sundanese under its government. Kuningan Kingdom then was absorbed to the former.

Islamic period
In 15th century, an ulama and also a ruler named Syarif Hidayatullah settled in Cirebon, with the intention of spreading Islam in this still pagan area. In the meantime, his pregnant wife Queen Ong-thien Nio from Ming China came to Kuningan and gave birth to a child named Prince of Kuningan. Prince of Kuningan establish his own realm and ascend the throne on 1 September 1498, a date regarded as the official establishment of Kuningan Regency.

Colonial era 
In 1930s, many of the residents moved to Sumatra and Kalimantan to work in oil and gas mines.

Post-Independence period
A notable event in Indonesian history occurred in Kuningan when the Linggadjati Agreement was signed between the Indonesian and Dutch government on 15 November 1946, in the village of Linggajati within the regency. There is a dedicated small museum at the village, about 25 km from Cirebon, which records the events of the Linggadjati conference.

In 1950s, due to insurgency of Kartosuwiryo, many of the residents moved to Jakarta and other large cities in Java island.

Geography 
Kuningan is located in the eastern area of West Java. It is bordered by Cirebon Regency to the north, Majalengka Regency to the west, Ciamis Regency and Cilacap Regency to the south, and Brebes Regency, Central Java to the east. The regency capital is the Kuningan District. Its mean elevation is 680 metres (2,520 ft) above sea level. The regency's landscape is composed of volcanoes, steep terrain, forest, mountains rivers and fertile agricultural land. The highest mountain in the province, Ciremai (3,076 m) is located between the border this regency and Majalengka Regency. There are numerous tropical rainforests in Kuningan, which contain tree species such as Pinus (Pinus merkusii), Teureup (Artocarpus elasticus), Yellow mahogany (Dysoxylum caulostachyum), Langsat (Lansium domesticum), and Putat (Planchonia valida).

Kuningan has an area of 1,178.57 km2. Western and southern parts are relatively mountainous, around 266–720 m above sea level, while the eastern and northern are lower, between 120 and 220 m. Most of rivers in the regency flow toward Java Sea from western and southern to northern and eastern parts of the regency. The exception is Cijolang River that flows southward to Indian Ocean.

In Darma District, there is Darma Dam (Waduk Darma) functioning as a clean water and irrigation source, fish farm, and tourist destination. The construction of the dam was started in 1942, but it was completed in early 1960s. A legendary creature in a form of giant white eel was believed by local residents as the reason of the lengthy duration of the construction.

Demographics

Population 
According to the 2000 census, Kuningan had 958,753 residents which made the density as 813/km2. Around 83% of them were in rural area, while the rest were in the city (regency) center. The field of works varied at that time: 169,509 people were in agriculture, 1,355 in mining, 24,965 in processing industry, 1,084 in water, gas, and electricity, 24,474 in constructions and engineering, 1,995 in commerce, 19,342 in transportation, 1,626 in finance, 41,851 in services, and the rest of 769 were in other fields.

According to the 2010 census, Kuningan's population was 1,035,589 people, consisting of 520,632 males and 514,957 females. The population was 97% Muslim, 2% Catholics and 1% followers of other religions. Its ethnic composition consisted of Sundanese 95%, Javanese 2%, and other groups 3%. The 2020 census showed a population of 1,167,686. In addition to Indonesian, the official national language, the other widely spoken language in the regency is Sundanese. In some areas near the eastern border with Central Java, Javanese and Banyumasan is also spoken.

Economy

Small scale enterprise in the regency includes the production of patchouli oil, an essential oil produced from Patchouli. But the cost and quality of patchouli oil produced in the area still needs to be improved.  The selling price of patchouli in the region fluctuates markedly. This reflects several factors including market access to end users and the role of national brokers in the marketing chain.  Standards of processing and refining of raw materials are not of high standards.  Distillation is done at the local level and quality is still low (not meeting ISO levels). Amongst other things, this is because farmers who are producing local patchouli oil do not pay attention to factors such as the treatment of raw materials, the proportion of patchouli stems used with leaves, distillation methods, types of material used, reliance on solar stills, and inappropriate cooling and circulation techniques in production.

Quality improvement efforts that need to be adopted include improving the quality of the Fe (iron) content of patchouli oil because excessive levels make the oil too dark. Purification can reduce levels of iron from as high as 340.2 ppm down to 104.5 ppm.  Further, densities that too small or too large reduce the low percentage of essential oil which can recovered.

Identification of the main components of local patchouli oil indicates a value of patchouli alcohol (PA) of about 27-29%.  Improved treatment of material to be distilled can raise levels of PA to about 30-32%.

Administrative divisions
The Kuningan Regency has an area of 1,194.09  km2; with an average population density of 978 people per km2 in 2020. It is divided into 32 districts (kecamatan), subdivided in turn into 376 villages (rural desa and urban kelurahan). These are listed below with their areas and their populations at the 2010 census and the 2020 census, together with the official estimates as at mid 2021. The table also includes the location of the district administrative centres, the number of villages in each district, and its postal codes.

Notes: (a) except the village of Cihirup (with a post code of 45593). (b) except the village of Mekasari (with a post code of 45576). (c) except the villages of Kasturi and Padarek (both with a post code of 45553).

Tourism

Tourist destinations 
There are several tourist locations in Kuningan Regency such as: the Linggarjati Museum, Sangkanhurip Hot Springs, Cibulan and Cigugur fish pond, Darma Dam (Waduk Darma), Cipari's Ancient settlement, and Talaga Remis (Remis Lake).

The area of Palutungan, a new location tourist destination, is known as the "Lembang of Kuningan" (Lembang and is a famous tourist destination near Bandung), located at 1,100 metres above sea level which has fresh air, good views and an 8-metre waterfall. The waterfall called Curug Putri (Lady Waterfall) is located in Cisantana village, Cigugur District. The traveller from Kuningan to Palutungan can pass through Cigugur fish pond and Cisantana Maria retreat cave.

There is a presumed distinct species in Kuningan that can only be found in lakes in Darmaloka, Cigugur, Cibulan, and Linggarjati called kancra fish or dewa fish. In Sangkanhurip village, there are hot springs containing sulfur. In Cigugur, there is a historical structure called Paseban Tritunggal (or Paseban Tri Panca Tunggal) built by Javanese-Sundanese local religion (Madraisme). Cipari Museum, a prehistoric themed museum, is also located in Cigugur.

Kuningan Botanical Garden

Kuningan Botanical Garden in Padabeunghar Village is 154.9 hectares and in September 2012, 29 hectares was on fire which killed 10,014 trees of 30 species. All of the burnt trees  which are planted in 2007 have not yet catalogued because of its pioneer status.

Sports
Kuningan is the home town of the Pesik football team. Its home base is Mashud Wisnusaputra Stadium. Other potential sports in Kuningan is athletics.

References

Bibliography

External links 

 Government of Kuningan Regency
 Government of West Java Province - Kuningan Regency